Below is a list of squads used in the 2010 Africa Cup of Nations.

Group A

Coach:  Manuel José
|

Coach:  Stephen Keshi

Coach: Kinnah Phiri

Coach: Rabah Saadane
|

Group B

Coach:  Vahid Halilhodžić
|

Coach:  Paulo Duarte
|

Coach:  Milovan Rajevac

Togo withdrew before the competition began following the attack on their team bus that left three people dead and others injured.

Coach:  Hubert Velud
|

Group C

Coach: Hassan Shehata

Coach: Shaibu Amodu

Coach:  Mart Nooij
|

Coach:  Michel Dussuyer
|

Group D

Coach:  Paul Le Guen

Coach:  Alain Giresse

Coach:  Hervé Renard

Coach: Faouzi Benzarti

References

Africa Cup of Nations squads
Squads